Sibsagar Assembly constituency is one of the 126 assembly constituencies of Assam Legislative Assembly. Sibsagar forms part of the Jorhat Lok Sabha constituency.

Members of Legislative Assembly 
 1951: Thanuram Gogoi, Indian National Congress 
 1957: Girindra nath Gogoi, Indian National Congress
 1962: Girindra nath Gogoi, Indian National Congress
 1967: Promode Gogoi, Communist Party of India
 1972: Promode Gogoi, Communist Party of India
 1978: Promode Gogoi, Communist Party of India
 1983: Devananda Konwer, Indian National Congress
 1985: Prodip Gogoi, Independent
 1991: Promode Gogoi, Communist Party of India
 1996: Promode Gogoi, Communist Party of India
 2001: Pranab Gogoi, Indian National Congress
 2006: Pranab Gogoi, Indian National Congress
 2011: Pranab Gogoi, Indian National Congress
 2016: Pranab Gogoi, Indian National Congress

Election results

2021

2016

2011

See also
List of constituencies of the Assam Legislative Assembly
Sivasagar district

References

External links 
 

Assembly constituencies of Assam
Sivasagar district